Moncé may refer to:

Moncé-en-Belin, a commune in the Sarthe department, France
Moncé-en-Saosnois, a commune in the Sarthe department, France
Moncé-lez-Amboise, site of a château and former nunnery, today in Limeray, France

See also
Moncey (disambiguation)